Danckert is a Dutch surname. Notable people with the surname include:

Cornelis Danckerts de Ry (1561-1634), Dutch Golden Age architect and sculptor
Dancker Danckerts (1634-1666), Dutch engraver and publisher
Ghiselin Danckerts (c. 1510-1567), Dutch Renaissance composer and singer
Hendrick Danckerts (c. 1625-1680), Dutch Golden Age painter
Johan Danckerts (c. 1616-1686), Dutch etcher and painter
Justus Danckerts (1635-1701), Dutch engraver and print publisher
Peter Danckerts de Rij (1605-1660), Dutch golden age painter

See also 
 Dankert
 Danckert